Kenneth Laine Ketner is an American philosopher. He is Paul Whitfield Horn Professor, Charles Sanders Peirce Interdisciplinary Professor and Director of Institute for Studies in Pragmaticism, Texas Tech University.

Books
 A Comprehensive Bibliography of the Published Works of Charles Sanders Peirce with a Bibliography of Secondary Studies, Bowling Green State University, 1986 (Bibliographies of Famous Philosophers)
 Elements of Logic: An Introduction to Peirce's Existential Graphs, Texas Tech University Press, 1990
 (ed., with Hilary Putnam), Charles Sanders Peirce: Reasoning and the Logic of Things: The Cambridge Conferences Lectures of 1898, Harvard University Press, 1992 (Harvard Historical Studies)
 (ed.) Charles Sanders Peirce: Reasoning and the Logic of Things, Harvard University Press, 1992
 Patrick H. Samway (ed.), A Thief of Peirce: The Letters of Kenneth Laine Ketner and Walker Percy, University Press of Mississippi, 1995
 (ed.) Peirce and Contemporary Thought: Philosophical Inquiries, Fordham University Press, 1995  (American Philosophy)
 His Glassy Essence: An Autobiography of Charles Sanders Peirce, Vanderbilt University Press, 1998 (The Vanderbilt Library of American Philosophy)

References

External links
 Kenneth Laine Ketner at Institute for Studies in Pragmaticism

20th-century American philosophers
Philosophy academics
Year of birth missing (living people)
Texas Tech University faculty
Living people